The Dambulla Giants (DG) is a franchise cricket team that competes in 2021 Lanka Premier League. The team is based in Dambulla, Central Province, Sri Lanka. In September 2021, Dambulla Viiking changed their name to Dambulla Giants after having new owners. The team was captained by Dasun Shanaka and coached by Stuart Law.

Current squad 
 Players with international caps are listed in bold.
  denotes a player who is currently unavailable for selection.
  denotes a player who is unavailable for rest of the season.

Administration and support staff

Teams and standings

League table

League matches

Playoffs

Eliminator

Qualifier 2

Statistics

Most runs

Most wickets

References 

2021 Lanka Premier League